Le Grand Blond avec un show sournois (the title a pastiche of the title of the film Le Grand Blond avec une chaussure noire) was a Québécois late night comedy television show presented by Marc Labrèche, shown from 2000 to 2003 (3 seasons) on TVA.

It was from this talk show that the idea of the show Le Cœur a ses raisons, a parody of American soaps, was born.

The show was produced by Dominique Chaloult for the production company Zone 3.

See also

La Fin du monde est à 7 heures

External links
  Archive of TVA
 Zone 3 page
 

TVA (Canadian TV network) original programming
2001 Canadian television series debuts
2003 Canadian television series endings
2000s Canadian satirical television series
Canadian late-night television programming
Television shows filmed in Montreal